A by-election was held for the Seanad Éireann Dublin University constituency in Ireland in March 2022. Ballot papers were issued on 25 February and polls closed at 11 a.m. on 30 March 2022. The election was won by former army officer and whistleblower Tom Clonan.

Background
The vacancy was caused by the election of Labour's Ivana Bacik to Dáil Éireann on 8 July 2021 at a by-election in Dublin Bay South. On 10 November 2021, the Seanad passed a motion calling on the clerk of the Seanad to send notice to the Minister for Housing, Local Government and Heritage of the vacancy. The minister was required to make the order for a by-election within six months of this notice.

Election system
Every citizen of Ireland who is at least 18 years old and who has received a degree (other than an honorary degree) or obtained a scholarship from the University of Dublin is entitled to be registered as an elector. The electorate of the university is approximately 70,000. When a casual vacancy occurs it is filled by a by-election. The procedure at a by-election is the same as that at a general election of university members. Candidates must be proposed and seconded by two registered electors, with the assent of eight other electors. All votes are cast by postal ballot, and are counted using the single transferable vote.

Candidates
Seventeen candidates were nominated. All nominations are non-partisan, with no provision for nomination by parties as there is in Dáil elections. These include, ordered by the date of their declaration: 
 Tom Clonan, former soldier, declared on 10 July 2021
 Hugo MacNeill, former rugby player, declared on 21 July 2021
 Gisèle Scanlon, Trinity College Dublin Graduate Students' Union President, declared on 21 July 2021 
 Ryan Alberto Ó Giobúin, sociology PhD researcher, declared on 21 September 2021 
 Ursula Quill, Bacik's former assistant and a Labour Party member
 Ray Bassett, former diplomat, declared on 1 November 2021 
 Sadhbh O'Neill, academic at Dublin City University declared in November 2021
 Eoin Barry, Labour Party member, declared in December 2021 
 Ade Oluborode, barrister, declared in January 2022. 
 Michael McDermott, PhD student at Trinity College Dublin, declared in January 2022.
 Maureen Gaffney, psychologist, author, broadcaster, declared in February 2022
 Hazel Chu, Green Party councillor and former Lord Mayor of Dublin, declared in February 2022 
 Aubrey McCarthy, founder of the homelessness and rehabilitation charity Tiglin, declared on 10 February 2022
 Patricia McKenna, former Member of the European Parliament for Dublin and former Cathaoirleach of the People's Movement, declared on 12 February 2022
 Catherine Stocker, Social Democrats councillor for Dublin City, declared in February 2022

Result

See also
List of Seanad by-elections

References

External links
Trinity College Dublin: Seanad Bye-Election 2022

By-election 2022
Dublin University by-election
Seanad
By-elections in the Republic of Ireland
March 2022 events in Ireland